Bishop of Bunbury may refer to:
Anglican Bishop of Bunbury, part of the Province of Western Australia, Western Australia
Bishop of Bunbury (Roman Catholic), in the Archdiocese of Perth, Western Australia